The Parish Congregation of the Evangelical Church is in Prague. Its denomination is the  Evangelical Church of Czech Brethren Christian denomination.

History and architecture
The church is not the shape of a traditional church but it has a schematic spire on its front in red bricks.

The organ dates from 1938 and has been used by many notable Czech musicians.

The church had a wooden font installed in 2002 designed by Ivan Jilemnický.

References

Churches in Prague 10